The Frederic Esser Nemmers Prize in Mathematics is awarded biennially from Northwestern University. It was initially endowed along with a companion prize, the Erwin Plein Nemmers Prize in Economics, as part of a $14 million donation from the Nemmers brothers. They envisioned creating an award that would be as prestigious as the Nobel prize. To this end, the majority of the income earned from the endowment is returned to the principal in order to increase the size of the award.

As of 2020, the award carries a $200,000 stipend and the scholar spends several weeks in residence at Northwestern University.

Recipients
Following recipients received this award:

1994 Yuri I. Manin
1996 Joseph B. Keller 
1998 John H. Conway
2000 Edward Witten
2002 Yakov G. Sinai 
2004 Mikhail Gromov
2006 Robert Langlands 
2008 Simon Donaldson
2010 Terence Tao
2012 Ingrid Daubechies
2014 Michael J. Hopkins
2016 János Kollár
2018 Assaf Naor
2020 Nalini Anantharaman
2022 Bhargav Bhatt

See also

 List of mathematics awards

References

External links
Citations page
Nemmers Prize 2012

Mathematics awards
Northwestern University
1994 establishments in Illinois